The 2005 Campeonato Nacional Clausura Copa Banco del Estado  was the 78th Chilean League top flight, in which Universidad Católica won its 9th league title after beating Universidad de Chile on penalties, in the finals.

Qualifying stage

Results

Group standings

Group A

Group B

Group C

Group D

Aggregate table

Repechaje

Playoffs

Finals

Season table

Top goalscorers

Promotion / relegation playoffs
O'Higgins reached its promotion to Primera División after beating Deportes Melipilla 4–3 in the aggregate result, in this way Rancagua–based side broke a five-year absence in top level. Whilst Deportes Puerto Montt remained in the top level after beating Provincial Osorno on penalties.

References

External links
RSSSF Chile 2005

Primera División de Chile seasons
Chile
2005 in Chilean football